The Journal of Contemporary Ethnography is a peer-reviewed academic journal that covers research in ethnography. The journal's editors-in-chief are Charles Edgley and Jeffrey E. Nash (University of Arkansas, Little Rock). It was established in 1972 and is currently published by SAGE Publications.

Abstracting and indexing 
The Journal of Contemporary Ethnography is abstracted and indexed in Scopus and the Social Sciences Citation Index. According to the Journal Citation Reports, its 2017 impact factor is 0.862, ranking it 32nd out of 40 journals in the category "Urban Studies" and 93rd out of 146 journals in the category "Sociology".

References

External links 
 

SAGE Publishing academic journals
English-language journals
Ethnography journals
Bimonthly journals
Publications established in 1972